Tehzeeb is a 2003 Indian Hindi-language drama film directed by Khalid Mohammed. It premiered on 21 November 2003. The film stars Shabana Azmi, Urmila Matondkar, Diya Mirza, Arjun Rampal and Rishi Kapoor in a special appearance. Urmila and Shabana were praised for their roles. It was inspired by Ingmar Bergman's Swedish drama Autumn Sonata (1978), and was dedicated to Bergman.

Plot
Anwar (Rishi Kapoor) and Rukhsana (Shabana Azmi) had been married for years. After the birth of their daughters Tehzeeb and Nazeen, Anwar goes into depression and commits suicide. Rukhsana is an ambitious and popular singer. After her husband's mysterious death, her elder daughter Tehzeeb (Urmila Matondkar) suspects her to be the cause of his departure. Despite the court declaring Rukhsana innocent, Tehzeeb still bears a grudge against her and accuses her of deserting her and Nazeen (Dia Mirza).

Years later, Tehzeeb has married Salim (Arjun Rampal) against her mother's wishes. Nazeen is mentally challenged, and Tehzeeb takes her under her custody. Tehzeeb lives happily with her husband and Nazeen, until Rukhsana decides to visit them and renew ties after five years. Both mother and daughter are happy about the upcoming visit, but the tension between them turns up eventually.

Many challenges and arguments arise because of Tehzeeb and Rukhsana's differences. But Tehzeeb and her mother have many good moments and Rukhsana grows close with both her daughters. Disaster then strikes when Nazeen shoots herself. Here the truth comes out that Anwar killed himself and Rukhsana wasn't responsible. Rukhsana wants to take Nazeen with her, but Tehzeeb doesn't agree. Salim convinces her and she finally gives her consent.

On the day that Rukhsana is to leave, she is sitting on the swing with her eyes closed. Tehzeeb goes up to her and apologizes, tells her she still loves her, but Rukhsana doesn't reply. Tehzeeb shakes her and Rukhsana falls over. In panic, Tehzeeb calls Salim. It is revealed that Rukhsana neglected her health and had a heart attack which she died of.

At the end of the movie, Tehzeeb is singing one of her mother's songs in her memory to a crowd while Salim and Nazeen watch her.

Cast
 Shabana Azmi as Rukhsana Jamal
 Urmila Matondkar as Tehzeeb Jamal Mirza
 Arjun Rampal as Salim Mirza
 Diya Mirza as Nazneen Jamal (Naazu) 
 Rishi Kapoor as Anwar Jamal (special appearance)
 Namrata Shirodkar as Aloka
 Satish Kaushik as Kamal Choksi
 Rekha Rao as Suman (Maid)
 Palak Jain
 Diana Hayden as Sheena Roy

Awards
Won
 Zee Cine Award Best Actor in a Supporting Role - Female – Shabana Azmi
Nominated
 Zee Cine Award Best Lyricist – Javed Akhtar
 Zee Cine Award Best Choreographer – Remo D'souza
 Star Screen Award Best Supporting Actress – Shabana Azmi
 Filmfare Best Supporting Actress Award – Shabana Azmi

Music

The soundtrack of the film contains six songs. The music is by A.R. Rahman. The lyrics were written by Javed Akhtar but the Ghazal songs had lyrics adapted from traditional poems of famous poets. Rahman introduced a singer Sujata Bhattacharya, who later renamed herself as Madhushree. An additional song "Habibi" was featured in the movie but was not released in cassettes or CDs.

References

External links
 

2003 films
2000s Hindi-language films
2000s Urdu-language films
Films scored by A. R. Rahman
20th Century Fox films